The Men's marathon 1A was a wheelchair marathon event in athletics at the 1984 Summer Paralympics. It was designed for male athletes in category 1A, with the most severe levels of disability. Three runners started the race: Heinrich Koeberle from West Germany, his compatriot H. Lobbering (full name not recorded), and Rainer Kueschall of Switzerland. Due to there being only three athletes in contention, each was guaranteed a medal upon finishing the race, but only Koeberle reached the finish line, in three hours, forty-one minutes and forty-seven seconds. He thus obtained the gold medal.

Results

See also
 Marathon at the Paralympics

References 

Men's marathon 1A
1984 marathons
Marathons at the Paralympics
Men's marathons